Sir James Thomson Ritchie, 1st Baronet (21 September 1833 – 18 September 1912) was a Scottish businessman who was the 576th Lord Mayor of London.

He was born in Angus, the second son of William Ritchie, a landed proprietor, of Rockhill House, Broughty Ferry, Forfarshire, head of the firm of William Ritchie & Son of London and Dundee, East India merchants, jute spinners, and manufacturers. His younger brother would be ennobled as Charles Ritchie, 1st Baron Ritchie of Dundee.

James became a partner in his father's business, based in London. He became an alderman of the City of London, served as Sheriff of London for 1896–97, and was knighted in 1897. He was elected Lord Mayor of London for 1903–04, and was created a baronet, of Highlands, Shanklin, on the Isle of Wight, on 15 December 1903.

In 1858, he married Lydia Rebecca Lemon, daughter of James Lemon. They had two sons and seven daughters. He died at Shanklin, at which point the baronetcy expired, despite having living male heirs. His eldest son, James William Ritchie, was created a baronet in his own right in 1918 "to regularize an informality in the previous title."

References

|-

1833 births
1912 deaths
People educated at the High School of Dundee
British businesspeople
Sheriffs of the City of London
19th-century English politicians
20th-century lord mayors of London
20th-century English politicians
Knights Bachelor
Baronets in the Baronetage of the United Kingdom
19th-century British businesspeople